The Kurdish Textile and Cultural Museum is a museum devoted to textiles produced in Iraqi Kurdistan. It was established in 2004 and is located in a renovated mansion in the southeast quarter of the Citadel of Arbil.

External links
https://www.academia.edu/91593333/Kurdish_Textiles_Museum_in_Erbil_Citadel

Buildings and structures in Erbil
Museums established in 2004
Textile museums
2004 establishments in Iraq
Museums in Erbil